Verónica Castro is the debut extended play (EP) by Mexican iconic pop singer Verónica Castro. It was released in 1973
and this is a 45" Vinyl LP that was used for Promotion Only and was given to Radio stations. Verónica Castro has said that this 45" was recorded before she was pregnant with her first son Cristian Castro in 1974.

Track listing
 "Tienes que Volver"
 "Tengo Tu Amor"
 "Si los Niños Gobernaran Al Mundo" (Original Version)
 "Dame Amor"  aka  Give Me Love (Give Me Peace on Earth)

1973 debut EPs
Verónica Castro albums